Lorenco Vila (born 14 December 1998) is an Albanian professional footballer who currently play as a centre-forward for Albanian club Teuta. His cousin is current Teuta and former Albania national team player Emiljano Vila.

References

1998 births
Living people
People from Durrës
People from Durrës County
Albanian footballers
Association football forwards
Kategoria Superiore players
KF Teuta Durrës players
Albania under-21 international footballers
Albania international footballers